Elysé Ratsiraka is a Malagasy politician and a medical practitioner.

He was the Minister of Energy. He was the brother of former Malagasy President Didier Ratsiraka.

In 2015 he was elected Mayor of Toamasina until his destitution in 2019.

References

Government ministers of Madagascar
Mayors of Toamasina
Living people
Year of birth missing (living people)